Bernardo Olvera (born 6 January 1963) is a Mexican wrestler. He competed at the 1984 Summer Olympics and the 1988 Summer Olympics.

References

1963 births
Living people
Mexican male sport wrestlers
Olympic wrestlers of Mexico
Wrestlers at the 1984 Summer Olympics
Wrestlers at the 1988 Summer Olympics
Place of birth missing (living people)
Pan American Games medalists in wrestling
Pan American Games silver medalists for Mexico
Wrestlers at the 1987 Pan American Games
Wrestlers at the 1991 Pan American Games
Medalists at the 1991 Pan American Games
20th-century Mexican people
21st-century Mexican people